The 2021 Volta ao Algarve (English: Tour of the Algarve) was a road cycling stage race that took place in the Algarve region of Portugal between 5 and 9 May 2021. It was the 47th edition of the Volta ao Algarve and was a category 2.Pro event on the 2021 UCI Europe Tour and the 2021 UCI ProSeries calendars.

The race was originally scheduled for 17 to 21 February, but due to rising COVID-19 cases in Portugal leading up to the race, it had to be postponed to 5 to 9 May.

Teams 
Seven UCI WorldTeams, eight UCI ProTeams, and ten UCI Continental teams made up the twenty-five teams that participated in the race. With each team fielding seven riders, there were 175 starters, of which 153 riders finished the race. 

UCI WorldTeams

 
 
 
 
 
 
 

UCI ProTeams

 
 
 
 
 
 
 
 

UCI Continental Teams

Route

Stages

Stage 1 
5 May 2021 – Lagos to Portimão,

Stage 2 
6 May 2021 – Sagres to Fóia,

Stage 3 
7 May 2021 – Faro to Tavira,

Stage 4 
8 May 2021 – Lagoa to Lagoa,  (ITT)

Stage 5 
9 May 2021 – Albufeira to Alto do Malhão,

Classification leadership table 

 On stage 2, Danny van Poppel, who was second in the points classification, wore the green jersey, because first-placed Sam Bennett wore the yellow jersey as the leader of the general classification.

Final classification standings

General classification

Points classification

Mountains classification

Young rider classification

Team classification

Notes

References

External links 
 

Volta ao Algarve
Volta ao Algarve
Volta ao Algarve
2021
Volta ao Algarve
Volta ao Algarve